First Baptist Christian School can refer to:

First Baptist Christian School (Indiana) in Mishawaka, Indiana
First Baptist Christian School (Louisiana) in Slidell, Louisiana
First Baptist Christian School (Elyria, Ohio) in Elyria, Ohio
First Baptist Christian School (Rhode Island) in Warwick, Rhode Island
First Baptist Christian School (Illinois) in Danville, Illinois